The 2013–14 season was the 45th campaign of the Scottish Men's National League, the national basketball league of Scotland. The season featured 10 teams. The season started on 6 September 2013 and ended with the Play-off Final on 6 April 2014. Falkirk Fury won their 3rd league title.

Teams

The line-up for the 2013-2014 season features the following teams:

Boroughmuir Blaze
City of Edinburgh Kings
Clark Eriksson Fury
Dunfermline Reign
Glasgow Rocks II
Glasgow Storm
Glasgow University
St Mirren West College Scotland
Stirling Knights
Troon Tornadoes

League table

Playoffs

Quarter-finals

Semi-finals

Final

References

  Scottish Basketball League 2013-14 - WebArchive 

Scottish Basketball Championship Men seasons
Scot
Scot
basketball
basketball